Peter Dougan Capaldi (born 14 April 1958) is a Scottish actor, director, writer and musician. He portrayed the twelfth incarnation of the Doctor in Doctor Who (2013–2017) and Malcolm Tucker in The Thick of It (2005–2012), for which he received four British Academy Television Award nominations, winning Best Male Comedy Performance in 2010. When he reprised the role of Tucker in the feature film In the Loop, Capaldi was honoured with several film critic award nominations for Best Supporting Actor.

Capaldi won the Academy Award for Best Live Action Short Film and the BAFTA Award for Best Short Film for his 1993 short film Franz Kafka's It's a Wonderful Life. He went on to write and direct the drama film Strictly Sinatra and directed two series of the sitcom Getting On. Capaldi also played Mr Curry in the family film Paddington (2014) and its sequel Paddington 2 (2017), voiced Rabbit in the Disney film Christopher Robin (2018) and portrayed supervillain The Thinker in the DC Extended Universe film The Suicide Squad (2021).

Early life
Capaldi was born in Glasgow, Scotland, to Nancy ( Soutar) and Gerald John Capaldi. His paternal grandfather was Italian, while the rest of his ancestry is Scottish and Irish. His parents ran an ice cream business in the Springburn district, where they were neighbours and acquaintances of the family of Armando Iannucci, creator of The Thick of It, although the two men did not know each other as children. He was educated at St Teresa's Primary School in Possilpark, St Matthew's Primary School in Bishopbriggs, and St Ninian's High School, Kirkintilloch, before attending the Glasgow School of Art.

Capaldi displayed an early talent for performance by putting on a puppet show in primary school. While at high school, he was a member of the Antonine Players, who performed at the Fort Theatre in Bishopbriggs. As an art student, he was the lead singer and guitarist in a punk rock band called The Dreamboys, whose drummer was future comedian Craig Ferguson. The pair also performed a cabaret act together as Bing & Dean Hitler and wrote an alternative pantomime of Sleeping Beauty. Capaldi went on to perform musical comedy cabaret in the guises of "bank clerk about town" Gavin Meekie and as one half of husband-and-wife TV evangelists Tom & Sammy Jo.

Career

Acting
Capaldi has appeared in over 40 films and television shows since his appearance as Danny Oldsen in Local Hero (1983). He played Beatles member George Harrison in John and Yoko: A Love Story (1985), had roles in The Lair of the White Worm (1988) and Dangerous Liaisons (1988), and was featured as Ozzy in a 1985 episode of Minder. In 1992 he auditioned for, but did not get, the role of Benjamin Sisko in Star Trek: Deep Space Nine.

Capaldi's first starring role on television was as Luke Wakefield, a strange man who imagines he has witnessed a crime, in the BBC drama series Mr Wakefield's Crusade. He played fictional Songs of Praise producer Tristan Campbell in two episodes of the sitcom The Vicar of Dibley, and a transgender woman in ITV's Prime Suspect. In Neil Gaiman's gothic fantasy Neverwhere, he portrayed the angel Islington.

Capaldi is also an audiobook narrator, and his many titles include several of the works of Iain Banks. He starred as Rory in the 1996 television version of Banks's The Crow Road.

In the 1999 Channel 4 series Psychos, he played a mathematician with bipolar disorder. Capaldi made an appearance as a university professor in the sitcom Peep Show, and played a prime suspect in the 2007 series of Waking the Dead. He voiced Chief Petty Officer Grieves in the BBC Radio Ministry of Defence comedy Our Brave Boys. In 2007, Capaldi appeared as Mark Jenkins (Sid's dad) in the E4 teen comedy drama series Skins. He returned for a second series in 2008 although his character died in the third episode. He appeared in the Midsomer Murders episode "Death in Chorus" and ITV1's Fallen Angel. He also appeared in the 2007 British comedy film Magicians.

He appeared as King Charles I in the Channel 4 series The Devil's Whore, aired in 2008. Capaldi provided his voice for the animated film Haunted Hogmanay in 2006. He played Balthazar, one of the Biblical Magi, in the 2010 BBC adaptation of The Nativity.

In November 2011, he began playing Professor Marcus in The Ladykillers at the Liverpool Playhouse, which then transferred to the Gielgud Theatre in London till April 2012. He appeared in The Field of Blood as Dr Pete, for which he received a BAFTA Scotland nomination in the TV actor/actress category; he was beaten by his co-star Jayd Johnson. He had a small role as a therapist in Big Fat Gypsy Gangster, written by and starring his Getting On co-star Ricky Grover. In 2012, Capaldi played Randall Brown, the new Head of News, on the BBC2 drama The Hour. He appeared as a WHO doctor in World War Z (2013), and had a role in Maleficent (2014), but his part in the latter film was cut during post-production.

He starred in Inside the Mind of Leonardo, a documentary about Leonardo da Vinci. In 2013 he portrayed Alan Rusbridger, the editor of The Guardian in The Fifth Estate. In 2014 he starred in a new adaptation of The Three Musketeers as Cardinal Richelieu on BBC One.

He appeared as Paddington Bear's neighbour Mr Curry in the family comedy film Paddington and its sequel Paddington 2. In 2018, he voiced Rabbit in the Disney film Christopher Robin. In 2022, he voiced Seamus McGregor in the Netflix series Big Mouth.

Malcolm Tucker
Prior to taking over the lead role in Doctor Who, Capaldi was best known for playing spin doctor Malcolm Tucker in the Armando Iannucci-written BBC sitcom The Thick of It, which he played from 2005 to 2012. Tucker is said to be largely, if loosely, based upon Tony Blair's right-hand man Alastair Campbell, although Capaldi has said that he based his performance more on Hollywood power players, such as the often abrasive Harvey Weinstein. A film spin-off from The Thick of It called In the Loop (in which Capaldi returned to the role of Tucker), was released in 2009.

The role of Tucker won Capaldi several awards. In 2006, 2008 and 2010 he was nominated for the BAFTA and RTS Best Comedy Actor Awards. He won the 2010 BAFTA Television Award for Male Performance in a Comedy Role. He also won the 2010 and 2012 British Comedy Award for Best TV Comedy Actor. He received another BAFTA Award nomination in 2013.

Doctor Who

Capaldi was cast in 2013 as the Doctor in the BBC science-fiction series Doctor Who, succeeding Matt Smith in the role. Capaldi first appeared as the Doctor in a cameo in the 50th anniversary special, "The Day of the Doctor", before appearing in the 2013 Christmas special, "The Time of the Doctor". A lifelong fan of the series, Capaldi had previously played Lobus Caecilius in the 2008 episode "The Fires of Pompeii" with the Tenth Doctor and his companion Donna Noble, as well as playing civil servant John Frobisher in the 2009 spin-off Torchwood: Children of Earth.

Before taking the role, Capaldi stated that he had to seriously consider the increased level of visibility that would come with the part. He revealed in an interview with Entertainment Weekly that he had been invited to audition for the role of the Eighth Doctor in 1995 prior to the production of the 1996 TV film, stating: "I didn't go. I loved the show so much, and I didn't think I would get it, and I didn't want to just be part of a big cull of actors."

In 2014, Capaldi voiced the Doctor on the CBBC website's game The Doctor and the Dalek and in 2015 voiced him in Lego Dimensions. In 2016, Capaldi reprised his role as the Twelfth Doctor in the Doctor Who spin-off programme Class, written by young-adult author Patrick Ness.

On 30 January 2017, in an interview on BBC Radio 2, Capaldi confirmed that the tenth series would be his last. His final episode was the 2017 Christmas special, "Twice Upon a Time", in which he was replaced by Jodie Whittaker.

Director, presenter and writer
In 1992, Capaldi wrote and starred in the road movie Soft Top, Hard Shoulder, which won the audience award at the London Film Festival. In 1995, he won an Oscar for Best Live Action Short Film for his film Franz Kafka's It's a Wonderful Life, which was tied with fellow nominee Trevor, leading to both films being announced as joint winners, and won the BAFTA Award for Best Short Film a year before that. He also wrote and directed Strictly Sinatra in 2001, and in 2009 he wrote and presented A Portrait of Scotland, a documentary detailing 500 years' history of Scottish portrait painting.

Capaldi directed several episodes of the 2009 BBC Four sitcom Getting On.

In 2012, Capaldi wrote (with Tony Roche), directed and performed in The Cricklewood Greats, an affectionate spoof documentary about a fictitious film studio, which tracks real developments and trends throughout the history of British cinema, including silent movies, horror and bawdy comedy, and a disastrous Terry Gilliam epic.

Personal life
Capaldi married Elaine Collins in Strathblane near his home city of Glasgow in 1991. Collins is an actress and television producer; they met in 1983 in a touring production for the Paines Plough Theatre Company. Together they have a daughter, Cecily. They live in Muswell Hill, London.

Capaldi grew up Catholic but became an atheist.

On 12 September 2016, Capaldi, with Cate Blanchett, Chiwetel Ejiofor, Jesse Eisenberg, Douglas Booth, Neil Gaiman, Keira Knightley, Juliet Stevenson, Kit Harington and Stanley Tucci, was featured in a video from the United Nations' refugee agency UNHCR to help raise awareness about the global refugee crisis. "What They Took With Them" has the actors reading a poem, written by Jenifer Toksvig and inspired by primary accounts of refugees, and is part of UNHCR's #WithRefugees campaign, which also includes a petition to governments to expand asylum to provide further shelter, integrating job opportunities, and education.

Capaldi's second cousin once removed is singer-songwriter Lewis Capaldi. The two worked together in the video for "Someone You Loved".

Capaldi is a patron of Worldwide Cancer Research, and the Scottish children's charity, the Aberlour Child Care Trust.

In October 2022, Capaldi voiced his support for Scottish independence. He told The Daily Telegraph: "It used not to be something I was particularly drawn to. I've lived in London for most of my life, and always loved Cardiff and Manchester and Belfast. But after the relentlessness of the past 12 years, everything we have been put through, it might just be time to go home and be a part of that."

Discography

Studio albums

Singles

Awards and nominations

References

External links

 
 
 Guardian Film Profile
 Article on Capaldi's support of Cancer Charities

1958 births
Living people
20th-century Scottish male actors
20th-century Scottish male singers
21st-century Scottish male actors
21st-century Scottish male singers
Audiobook narrators
Best Male Comedy Performance BAFTA Award (television) winners
British male comedy actors
Directors of Live Action Short Film Academy Award winners
Former Roman Catholics
Male actors from Glasgow
People educated at St Ninian's High School, Kirkintilloch
People from Crouch End
People from Springburn
People of Lazian descent
Scottish atheists
Scottish film directors
Scottish male film actors
Scottish male stage actors
Scottish male television actors
Scottish male video game actors
Scottish male voice actors
Scottish people of Irish descent
Scottish people of Italian descent
Scottish screenwriters
Scottish television directors